Mohamed Fofana may refer to:

 Mohamed Fofana (footballer, born March 1985), Malian footballer
 Mohamed Fofana (footballer, born May 1985), French footballer
 Mohamed Fofana (footballer, born October 1985), Guinean footballer